Eidsvoll (sometimes written as Eidsvold) is a municipality in Akershus in Viken county, Norway.  It is part of the Romerike traditional region.  The administrative centre of the municipality is the village of Sundet.

General information

Etymology
The first element is the genitive case of the word eid (Old Norse: eið) and the last element is voll (Old Norse: vǫllr) which means "meadow" or "field". The meaning of the word eid in this case is "a road passing around a waterfall". People from the districts around the lake (Mjøsa) who were sailing down the river Vorma, and people from Romerike sailing up the same river, both had to enter this area by passing the Sundfossen waterfall. Because of this, the site became an important meeting place long before the introduction of Christianity. Prior to 1918, the name was spelled "Eidsvold". The town of Eidsvold in Queensland, Australia and Eidsvold Township, Lyon County, Minnesota, United States still use this old spelling.

Eidsvoll Church 
Eidsvoll Church (Eidsvoll Kirke) is a cruciform church from approx 1200. It is part of the Norwegian Church and belongs to Øvre Romerike deanery in the Diocese of Borg. The Romanesque building is in stone.  Eidsvoll church is repeatedly burned and rebuilt. The old church records were lost in a fire. The altarpiece in Eidsvoll church is from 1765. It is a wooden structure with three floors, decreasing towards the top, where each floor concludes with gilded pilasters with capitals and rococo decor on each side of a painting. The altarpiece was restored after a fire in 1883, the next restoration occurred in 1915 and a third restoration occurred late 1960s. Access to the church is a well traveled tourist destination is via Rv181 and Fv502 / Rv177. Pilegrimsleden goes through Eidsvoll. Eidsvoll church is one of the more prominent stops along the path, which was officially opened on 16 June 2002.

Coat-of-arms
The coat-of-arms is from modern times.  They were granted on 20 November 1987.  The arms show a balance as a symbol of justice. In the early Middle Ages a local court was established in Eidsvoll.

History
The parish of Eidsvold was established as a municipality on 1 January 1838 (see formannskapsdistrikt). The municipality of Feiring was merged with Eidsvoll on 1 January 1964.

Eidsvoll is mentioned in Old Norse manuscripts. In the 11th century, it became the site of court and assembly (ting) for eastern parts of Norway, replacing Vang, now a part of Hamar in Hedmark.  Because of its access to the river Vorma and the lake Mjøsa has long provided a thoroughfare to northern parts of inland Norway.  Historically  the main industry of Eidsvoll was agriculture, though the soil is rich in clay. Eastern parts of Eidsvoll were for a short time the site of a minor gold rush when gold was found in 1758, and these areas are still known as Gullverket.

Eidsvoll Verk was opened to smelt iron ore by King Christian IV of Denmark in 1624, relying on the excellent water power from the Andelva river. In 1688, it was owned by the director of the Kongsberg Silver Mines, Schlanbusch, and remained in his family until 1781. Carsten Anker came into possession of works in 1794, at which time it was in decay since many of the surrounding forests required for charcoal had been depleted.  He restored it and set up the production of stoves and similar iron goods. He also took residence in Eidsvoll in 1811, rebuilding  the manor house which is now the Eidsvollsbygningen, the site where the constitutional assembly met to draft and sign the Constitution of Norway on 17 May 1814. Eidsvollsbygningen  is today a famous museum.

In 1854, Eidsvoll became the end point for the first railroad line in Norway from Oslo.  This became the transit point for travel with the steamship Skibladner to Hamar, Gjøvik, and Lillehammer on the lake Mjøsa. In addition to the historic Eidsvoll Church, Eidsvoll is the site of the Langset Church (Langset kirke) which dates to 1859  and the Feiring Church (Feiring Kirke) which dates to 1875.

Eidsvoll gallery

Geography
Eidsvoll municipality is bordered on the north by Østre Toten (in Oppland county on the west side of Mjøsa) and by Stange (on the east side of the lake) and to the east by Nord-Odal (both in Hedmark county). In the county of Akershus to the southeast lies Nes, to the south lies Ullensaker, and to the west lies Nannestad and Hurdal.

In addition to being a commuter town for Oslo, it also has agriculture and forestry industries. The main population and commercial centres are Sundet and Råholt.

Notable residents

 Henrik Wergeland (1808–1845) poet, writer and playwright; brought up in Eidsvoll; son of Professor Nicolai Wergeland (1780–1848)
 Alf Collett (1844–1919) a Norwegian writer, genealogist and historian
 Hans Langseth (1846–1927) Norwegian-American world record holder for the longest beard
 Cecilie Thoresen Krog (1858–1911) feminist pioneer, first female university student in Norway
 Fredrikke Waaler (1865-1952) composer, violinist and proponent for women's rights
 Maja Flagstad (1871–1958) a pianist, choral conductor and répétiteur
 F. Melius Christiansen (1871–1955) Lutheran choral conductor in Marinette, Wisconsin
 Arne Ekeland (1908–1994), artist, lived and worked in Bøn his entire life
 Ola Skjåk Bræk (1912–1999), minister of industry, born and raised in Eidsvoll
 Per Gjestvang (1915-2002) a veterinarian, resistance member, military officer and politician
 Dagmar Lahlum (1923–1999), resistance worker in WWII , fiancée of Eddie Chapman
 Åsmund Lønning Strømnes (1927–2009), professor of education; lived in Eidsvoll 
 Leif Johansen (1930-1982) an economist and professor
 Sivert Donali (1931–2010) a Norwegian sculptor, lived in Feiring from 1973
 Drude Berntsen (born 1939) a computer scientist, director of Norwegian Computing Center
 Kari Hag (born 1941) mathematician, researched complex analysis on quasicircles
 Siv Stubsveen (born 1968) a Norwegian model, saleswoman and media personality 
 Stian Carstensen (born 1971) a multi-instrument jazz musician, member of Farmers market
 Jan Gunnar Røise (born 1975) a Norwegian theatre and film actor 
 Stella Mwangi (born 1986) a Kenyan-Norwegian singer, musician, songwriter and rapper.
 Alexandra Rotan (born 1996) a singer for Norway in the Eurovision Song Contest 2019

Sport 
 Tormod Knutsen (born 1932) a retired Nordic combined skier, silver and gold medallist at the 1960 & 1964 Winter Olympics 
 Ole Einar Martinsen (born 1967) a retired footballer with 300 club caps and two with Norway 
 Henning Berg (born 1969) a football manager and former player with 422 club caps and 100 with Norway
 Espen Aarnes Hvammen (born 1988) a Norwegian champion speed skater 
 Henrik Furuseth (born 1996) a Norwegian racing driver

Sister cities
The following cities are twinned with Eidsvoll:
  - Egilsstaðir, Iceland
  - Skara, Västra Götaland County, Sweden
  - Sorø, Region Sjælland, Denmark
  - Suolahti, Länsi-Suomi, Finland

References

External links

Municipal fact sheet from Statistics Norway

Eidsvollbygningen museum

 
Municipalities of Akershus
Municipalities of Viken (county)
Constitution of Norway